"Sucker" is a song by American pop rock band Jonas Brothers. The song was released on March 1, 2019, through Republic Records. It is the group's first single released together in six years, since their reunion a day before the song was released. Ryan Tedder wrote and produced the song alongside the group co-writing with Louis Bell, Mustafa Ahmed and Homer Steinweiss. The song was also co-produced by Frank Dukes. The Jonas Brothers appeared on The Late Late Show with James Corden each night from March 4 to 7 to promote the track. It became the brothers' biggest hit single to date, reaching number one in several countries, including Australia, Canada, Latvia, Mexico, New Zealand, Singapore, Slovakia and the United States.

The official music video for "Sucker" featured their wives: Priyanka Chopra (Nick's wife), Sophie Turner (Joe's then-fiancée and now wife) and Danielle Jonas (Kevin's wife). The song was nominated for Best Pop Duo/Group Performance for the 62nd Annual Grammy Awards and in four categories at the 2019 MTV Video Music Awards, including Video of the Year, winning for Best Pop Video.

Background and composition
The group had blacked out their social media prior to announcing the release on February 28. Us Weekly had also revealed the title of the song before the announcement. On The Late Late Show with James Corden, Nick Jonas stated that "We've kept this a secret now for almost seven, eight months." In terms of musical notation, the song is composed in  time and the key of C♯ minor with moderately fast tempo of 138 beats per minute. The band's vocals span a range of B3 to C♯5.

Commercial performance
In the United States, "Sucker" debuted at number one on the Billboard Hot 100 and the US Hot Digital Songs chart, with 88,000 copies sold in its first week. It was the thirty-fourth song to debut atop the Billboard Hot 100. "Sucker" became the Jonas Brothers' first number-one song and the first number one by a boy band on the chart since 2003's "Bump, Bump, Bump" by B2K featuring P. Diddy. It became the band's first entry on the chart since 2013's "Pom Poms" and their first top 10 since 2008's "Tonight". The Jonas Brothers also became the second group in a lead role in history to have a song debuted at number one after Aerosmith's rock ballad "I Don't Want to Miss a Thing" from Armageddon (1998) and the first group in this century to achieve this. It fell to number six the following week, but as airplay continued to rise the song was able to return to the top five in May and reached as high as number three on May 27, while also reaching the top of the Radio Songs chart. The song ultimately spent 22 weeks in the top ten of the chart before falling 9–12 on August 17, 2019. In the April 20, 2019 issue of Billboard's Dance/Mix Show Airplay Chart, "Sucker" became the Jonas' first number one, surging to the top spot within four weeks.

This was also their first song in the United Kingdom to chart the Top 10 and consequently, the Top 5, debuting at number 6 and later peaking at number 4 on the fourth week.

As of May 8, 2019, the song had over 630 million global streams.

Music video
The music video was directed by Anthony Mandler and premiered showcasing the brothers with each of their significant others: Kevin's wife Danielle (née Deleasa), Nick's wife Priyanka Chopra Jonas, and Joe's then–fiancée Sophie Turner. It was filmed in Hertfordshire at Hatfield House, the home of the Marquess of Salisbury, where Queen Elizabeth I grew up and featured corgis, which are the favorite breed of Queen Elizabeth II.

Their outfits were designed by Prabal Gurung, from his debut menswear line.

The video cites The Blue Angel with Sophie Turner smoking in blue négligée and top hat as Lola Lola (Marlene Dietrich) while Joe Jonas embarrasses himself in a bondage position as Professor Immanuel Rath (Emil Jannings).

Awards and nominations
{| class="wikitable plainrowheaders"
|-
! Year
! Organization
! Award
! Result
! Ref.
|-
! scope="row" rowspan="16"| 2019
| rowspan=2| Teen Choice Awards
| Choice Song: Group
| 
| align="center" rowspan=2 | 
|-
| Choice Pop Song
| 
|-
| rowspan=4| MTV Video Music Awards
| Video of the Year
| 
| align="center" rowspan=4|
|-
| Song of the Year
| 
|-
| Best Pop Video
| 
|-
| Song of the Summer 
| 
|-
| rowspan=2| LOS40 Music Awards 
| Best International Song 
| 
|-
| Best International Video
|  
|-
| MTV Millennial Awards
| Global Hit
| 
|-
| MTV Millennial Awards Brazil
| Global Hit
| 
|-
| Nickelodeon Mexico Kids' Choice Awards
| Favorite Hit
| 
|-
| Nickelodeon Kids' Choice Awards
| Favorite Song
| 
|-
| People's Choice Awards
| Song of the Year
| 
|-
| rowspan=3 | TeleHit Awards
| Best Anglo Video
| 
|-
| Best Anglo Song
| 
|-
| People’s Best Video
| 
|-
! scope=row rowspan=7 | 2020
| Grammy Awards
| Best Pop Duo/Group Performance
| 
| align="center" | 
|-
| ASCAP Music Awards
| Song of the Year
| 
|-
| Billboard Music Awards
| Best Radio Song
| 
|-
| BMI Pop Awards
| Most Performed Song of the Year
| 
|-
| rowspan=3 | iHeartRadio Music Awards
| Song of the Year
| 
|-
| Best Music Video
| 
|- 
| Titanium Award
|

Live performances
On March 7, 2019, the Jonas Brothers performed the song for the first time on The Late Late Show with James Corden. On May 2, 2019, they performed the song at the Billboard Music Awards along with Nick's debut hit Jealous and Joe's hit song Cake by the Ocean with his band DNCE. On May 11, 2019, they performed the song again on Saturday Night Live as the musical guests. They also performed the song on the first episode of All That's revival on June 15, 2019.
The Jonas Brothers performed "Sucker" along "X" (without Karol G) and "What A Man Gotta Do" as Exclusive 'home' sessions recorded especially for BBC Radio 1's Big Weekend.

Plagiarism allegations
American rock band, Portugal. The Man accused the Jonas Brothers' song as copying their 2017 single, "Feel It Still". Portugal. The Man tweeted: "To be fair, the chorus of Feel It Still sounds very similar to Please Mister Postman by the Marvelettes... Which we respectfully cleared and thanked them for every chance we got. As one does. @jonasbrothers" The band later clarified saying that they were "not mad at all", and that they "actually dig a lot of their music and Nick's solo records".

Credits and personnel
Credits adapted from Tidal.

 Nick Jonas – vocals, songwriter
 Joe Jonas – vocals, songwriter
 Kevin Jonas – vocals, songwriter
 Louis Bell – songwriter, bass guitar
 Ryan Tedder –  background vocals, producer, songwriter, programmer, acoustic guitar, bass guitar, drum programmer
 Frank Dukes – co-producer, songwriter, guitar
 Homer Steinweiss – drums, songwriter
 Mustafa Ahmed – songwriter
 Andrew DeRoberts – guitar
 Randy Merrill – mastering engineer
 Serban Ghenea – mixer
 John Hanes – assistant mixer

Charts

Weekly charts

Year-end charts

Decade-end charts

All-time charts

Certifications

See also
 List of Billboard Hot 100 number-one singles of 2019
 List of Canadian Hot 100 number-one singles of 2019
 List of number-one songs of 2019 (Singapore)
 List of Billboard Adult Contemporary number ones of 2019 and 2020 (U.S.)
 List of airplay number-one hits of the 2010s (Argentina)

Notes

References

2019 singles
2019 songs
Billboard Hot 100 number-one singles
Canadian Hot 100 number-one singles
Jonas Brothers songs
Music videos directed by Anthony Mandler
Number-one singles in Australia
Number-one singles in New Zealand
Number-one singles in Singapore
Songs involved in plagiarism controversies
Song recordings produced by Ryan Tedder
Songs written by Frank Dukes
Songs written by Joe Jonas
Songs written by Kevin Jonas
Songs written by Louis Bell
Songs written by Nick Jonas
Songs written by Ryan Tedder
Song recordings produced by Frank Dukes
Republic Records singles